Piano Quartet No. 2 may refer to:
 Piano Quartet No. 2 (Brahms)
 Piano Quartet No. 2 (Dvořák)
 Piano Quartet No. 2 (Enescu)
 Piano Quartet No. 2 (Fauré)
 Piano Quartet No. 2 (Mendelssohn)
 Piano Quartet No. 2 (Mozart)
 Piano Quartet No. 2 (Oswald)